Bruce Wallace "Scotty" Bierce (September 3, 1896 – April 26, 1982) was a professional American football player and coach. He played for the Akron Pros, Buffalo All-Americans, Cleveland Indians and Cleveland Bulldogs of the National Football League (NFL). Bierce won a league title in 1920 with the Pros and he won a second title in 1924 with the Bulldogs. Scotty also served as a player-coach for the Pros in 1925. He played college football at University of Akron.

After his playing career ended, Briece became a prominent Akron attorney and a community leader.

The Bruce W. "Scotty" Bierce Athletic Scholarship Fund
The Bruce W. "Scotty" Bierce Athletic Scholarship Fund is an athletic scholarship at the University of Akron. It was established in Scott's will and provides scholarships for deserving athletes at the University. Awards are made by the director of athletics in cooperation with the University Scholarship Committee. Bierce excelled in football while at the University. He was inducted into the Summit County Sports Hall of Fame in 1957 and the University of Akron Sports Hall of Fame in 1975.

References

External links
 

1896 births
1982 deaths
American football ends
Akron Pros coaches
Akron Pros players
Akron Zips football players
Buffalo All-Americans players
Cleveland Bulldogs players
Cleveland Indians (NFL 1923) players
Ohio lawyers
People from Cuyahoga Falls, Ohio
Players of American football from Akron, Ohio
People from Kearney, Nebraska
Coaches of American football from Ohio
20th-century American lawyers